Cooking Mama 4: Kitchen Magic released as Cooking Mama 4 in Japan, Europe and Australia, is a 2011 video game for the Nintendo 3DS and the sequel to the Nintendo DS video game Cooking Mama 3: Shop & Chop and is the fourth installment to the Cooking Mama series. Kitchen Magic is the first Cooking Mama game to be released for the Nintendo 3DS and features 200 mini-games using the touch screen and 60 different recipes.

The successor to this game, Cooking Mama 5: Bon Appétit! for the Nintendo 3DS, was released on November 21, 2013.

Development
The game was released on November 2011 in North America, Europe, Australia and December 1, 2011 in Japan. It was first announced in May 2011.

Reception

Cooking Mama 4 received "mixed" reviews according to video game review aggregator Metacritic.  In Japan, Famitsu gave it a score of one eight, one seven, one eight, and one seven, for a total of 30 out of 40.

Notes

References

External links
Official Japanese website

2011 video games
505 Games games
Cooking Mama
Cooking video games
Nintendo 3DS games
Nintendo 3DS eShop games
Nintendo 3DS-only games
Majesco Entertainment games
Video games developed in Japan
Simulation video games